Vratislav Effenberger (22 April 1923 in Nymburk; - 10 August 1986 in Prague) was a Czech literature theoretician. He has German Bohemian descent from his paternal side, but has assimilated into Czech.

Life and career
In 1944, Effenberger left industrial school with his Abitur. He went to study chemistry and the history of art as well as aesthetics at the philosophical faculty. Starting from 1946, he joined the Czechoslovakian Film institute, from which he was dismissed 1954. He was then a worker until 1966 and later was appointed to the Czech Academy of Sciences. In 1970, he was dismissed for political reasons and had to take a job as a nightwatchman. In 1969, he became editor of the surrealist magazine Analogon; which around 1968 it published newspapers and magazines, which were concerned with literature, theatre or art.

Works
He became famous with a collection of film scripts and pseudo-scripts Surovost života a cynismus fantasie.

Most of his works were self-published in a handwritten form. He also published numerous articles in newspapers and magazines. Some of his works were seized and destroyed by the Czech State Security.

Books
 Henri Rousseau, Státní nakladatelství krásné literatury a umění (SNKLU) Prague 1963, monographie 
 Reality and poetry (Realita a poezie), 1969 
 Formative expressions Surrealismus (Výtvarné projevy surrealismu), Odeon Prague 1969 
 Development of thearalischer styles (Vývoj divadelních slohů), 1972 self publishing house 
 Rawness of the Life and the Cynicism of the Fantasy (Surovost života a cynismus fantasie), Sixty-Eight Publishers Toronto 1984, Orbis Prague 1991
 Hunt for the black shark (Lov na černého žraloka), PmD-Publ. 1987 Munich, poems
 Poems I, (Básně I), Torst Prague 2004 
 Hunt for the black shark (Polowanie na czarnego rekina), Atut 2006 Wrocław, 
 Poems II, (Básně II), Torst Prague 2007 
 Republic and testicles, (Republiku a varlata), Torst Prague 2012

Manuscripts
 Surrealistic poetry (Surrealistická poezie) (1969) 
 Models and methods (Modely a metody) (1969) 
 Treasure of seeing (Poklad vidění) - a study from the history of the modern forming art. (1970) 
 Karel of pastes (1970) 
 Karel Havlíček (1971) Monographie
 Picture and word (Obraz A slovo) (1971) 
 Osvobozené divadlo (1972–73) 
 Karol Baron (1977) Monographie 
 The Trumbild and imagination (Vidění a imaginace) (1977)

Movie 
 2018 Vratislav Effenberger aneb Lov na černého žraloka (Vratislav Effenberger, or Hunting on a Black Shark), document, 85 min. Directed David Jařab (CS)

References

External links
 
 Surrealist Group of Czechoslovakia (FR)

Czech poets
Czech male poets
Surrealist poets
Czech surrealist writers
Charter 77 signatories
1923 births
1986 deaths
20th-century Czech poets
People from Nymburk
Czech people of German descent